Aristeidis Moschos (Greek: Αριστείδης Μόσχος; 1930 – 8 November 2001) was a Greek player and teacher of the santouri.

Biography
Moschos was born in Agrinio, a city in the Aitoloakarnania district. He was fifth in a family of ten children. The family was originally from the village of Pentalofos near the town of Agrinio. In that village, his father owned a large amount of land which he later sold and moved the family to Agrinio where he opened two coffee houses which played music.

In one of those coffee houses, musicians from Constantinople, Smyrna and Armenia appeared while the others had a European orchestra. His father was a gifted clarino player which he used to play traditional Greek as well as other European music. His brother played the violin. The family's cafés were visited by some of the greatest musicians of that time, including Rita Abatzi, Marika Politissa, and Roza Eskenazi. Aristidis Moschos first heard the santouri played by in Romanian touring musical group and came to love the instrument.

His first teacher was a member of that group, Nestoras Batsi. He quickly learned how to play and started appearing in his father's businesses. After the war, he left Agrinio and went to Athens where he attended the Greek Lyceum.

With the Lyceum he did tours all over the world. He participated with many singers, musicians and actors. He made many radio and television broadcasts of modern and folk music. He released fifteen records, of which three became gold and two became platinum. He participated as a soloist in around 150 other records.

In 1985, he ran the Traditional Music People's School which functioned as a nonprofit company, where he taught several musical instruments as well as Byzantine Music. He was honoured by several municipalities and organizations as well as the Greek Parliament.

Moschos died on 8 November 2001.

References
The first version of the article is translated from the article at the Greek Wikipedia

External links
 An Article (in Greek) on the Agrinio's newspaper Nea Epohi. It has a photo of Aristidis Moschos.

1930 births
2001 deaths
20th-century Greek educators
20th-century Greek musicians
Date of birth missing
Greek musicians
People from Agrinio